Biruta may refer to:

People
 Biruta (given name) or Birutė, a Lithuanian and Latvian female given name
 Biruta (mythology) or Birutė, mythologized version of the wife of Kęstutis, the priestess of Palanga, worshipped as a deity
 Gilvydas Biruta (born 1991), a Lithuanian basketball player
 Vincent Biruta (born 1958), a Rwandan physician and politician

Places
 Biruta (ancient city); the historic ancient city of antiquity at the core of Beirut, Lebanon; before Alexander
 Berytus, the Hellenistic, Roman, Byzantine era version of the city of Beirut, also Biruta in the local language at the time of Alexander.

Other uses
 Biruta (poem), a heroic poem by Silvestras Teofilis Valiūnas, that became a Lithuanian hymn, composed in the Samogitian dialect
 Biruta (short story), a short story by Lygia Fagundes Telles. featuring a dog named Biruta
 Biruta (armoured vehicle), a Polish tank; see 2nd Armoured Brigade (Poland)

See also

 Birute (disambiguation)